Mutant Throbbing Gristle is a remix album of material originally by Throbbing Gristle.

A limited number of white label promotional 12" vinyl copies were issued with the "TG" logo stamped in black on all four sides and sleeved in a generic grey Novamute sleeve.

Track listing

CD (Nomu122CD)
"Persuasion (Motor Remix)" – 5:01
"Hot on the Heels of Love (Carl Craig Re-version)" – 9:05
"What A Day (Hedonastik Remix)" – 5:57
"United (Two Lone Swordsmen Remix – Vocal Version)" – 5:22
"Hamburger Lady" (Carter Tutti Remix) – 4:45
"Hot on the Heels of Love (Ratcliffe Remix)" – 8:01
Remix by Simon Ratcliffe from Basement Jaxx
"Still Walking (Carl Craig Re-version)" – 7:37
"HotHeelsUnited" (Carter Tutti Remix) – 6:30

2x12" vinyl (Nomu122LP)
Side A
"Hot on the Heels of Love (Carl Craig Re-version)" – 9:05
Side B
"United (Two Lone Swordsmen Remix – Instrumental Version)" – 5:22
"United (Two Lone Swordsmen Remix – Vocal Version)" – 5:17
Side C
"HotHeelsUnited (Carter Tutti Remix)" – 6:30
"Persuasion (Motor Remix)" – 5:01
Side D
"Hot on the Heels of Love (Ratcliffe Remix)" – 8:01

References

2004 remix albums
Throbbing Gristle remix albums
Novamute Records remix albums